Chinese Paladin 3 is a 2009 Chinese television series adapted from the video game of the same title, and, because of an added time travel concept allowing the protagonist from Chinese Paladin (2005) to appear in the setting decades before the events of the first. It was first aired on Taizhou Broadcasting Station in June 2009. Chinese Paladin 2 was not filmed because the producers felt that the third game had a much stronger story than the second.

The series achieved massive popularity and topped ratings chart in various regions of China. It was awarded the Ratings Contribution award at the Sichuan Festival.

Synopsis
This is a prequel to Chinese Paladin and takes place 50 years earlier.

Jing Tian (Hu Ge) is a mischievous pawnshop assistant who because of the power of a mystical jade, crosses paths with the spoiled and sassy Tang Xue Jian (Yang Mi). Xue Jian is the beloved granddaughter of Tang Manor's Tang Kun, who meets with danger when an evil cult tries to take over control of the Tang Manor. Xu Changqing (Wallace Huo), the eldest disciple of Mt Shu Sect aids the pair in defeating the cult and rescuing the Tang Manor.

Meanwhile, Chong Lou (Jerry Huang), ruler of the evil world, breaks into Mt Shu's Suo Yao Pagoda to retrieve a magical sword. He passes the sword to Jing Tian, claiming that it belonged to the latter when he was a deity in his past life and forces Jing Tian to battle with him. The 5 elders of Mt Shu Sect call upon Jing Tian and Chang Qing to attain 5 mystical pearls to seal up Suo Ya Pagoda and destroy a powerful force of evil so as to save the world from destruction. Together with Xue Jian, the group set off to accomplish their mission.

On the way, they overcome various obstacles and must solve mysteries pertaining to their pasts. Long Kui (Cecilia Liu), a 1000-year-old ghost emerges from the magical sword Jing Tian possessed. She claimed to be the princess of Jiang, and that he is her beloved brother. Later, Jing Tian realizes that Long Kui is telling the truth so she journeys with them. Next, Xu Changqing meets Zi Xuan (Tiffany Tang), a 200-year-old descendant of the Nuwa goddess. Chang Qing discovers his memory of her was sealed and she was, in fact, the love of his life in two lifetimes. Struggling to deal with his feelings and carrying the burden to save the world, he initially rejects her. Jing Tian also comes to realize he was Fei Peng (2,000 years ago) and Long Yang (1,000 years ago). Xue Jian also finds out that she was originally a fruit created by Xi Yao, a goddess who guards the tree in the heavenly realm. It blooms a flower in 500 years and grows a fruit in 1,000 years.

Eventually, Evil Sword Immortal takes over the world and is in control of all 6 realms making him close to impossible to defeat. Jing Tian combines powers with everyone, along with Chang Qing to defeat him. Long Kui sacrificed herself by sealing her spirit into the sword to strengthen it.

Cast

 Hu Ge as Jingtian / Feipeng / Long Yang / Li Xiaoyao
 Wallace Huo as Xu Changqing / Lin Yeping / Gu Liufang
 Yang Mi as Tang Xue Jian / Xi Yao
 Cecilia Liu as Long Kui
 Tiffany Tang as Zixuan
 Jerry Huang as Chonglou
 Gordon Liu as Evil Sword Immortal
 Lam Chi-chung as Xu Maoshan
 Justin Yuan as Lei Yunting 
 Yan Hongyu as Chang Yin
 Liu Rui as He Biping
 Liu Xiaojie as Wan Yuzhi
 He Yan as Divine Lady
 Deng Limin as Tang Tai
 Yue Yueli as Tang Kun
 Guo Xiaoting as Hua Ying
 Han Zhi as Luo Rulie
 Han Xiao as Fire Ghost Queen
 Lin Jiajun as Jingjing
 Xiao Bing as Zhao Wuyan
 Zhao Zhuona as Shuibi
 Song Yang as Xifeng
 Han Zhenhua as Qinghui
 Fan Ming as Heavenly Emperor
 Zong Fengyan as King of Jiang
 Lu Meifang as Tang Zhiyun
 Guo Qiming as Zhao Wenchang
 Chan Ganlin as Chang Huai
 Hu Zhonghu as Shouzhen
 Yang Long as Shouyi
 Jin Sheng as Shouguan
 Sun Jiaolong as Heavenly Demonic Emperor
 Zhang Lei as Tang Yi
 Yao Huiru as Aunt Ma
 Liu Zifei as Jingtian's mother
 Zhou Hong as Jingu
 Lou Yajiang as Jingyi
 Wang Zichen as Wenxuan
 Zhang Jianhong as Wenxuan's mother
 Liu Changsheng as Anxi old man
 Li Linlin as Zhao Wenchang's wife
 Gongfang Min as Gu Liufang's master
 Xu Shouqin as Guteng old man
 Yang Sheng as Ding Shiyan

Soundtrack

Track list
 Shengsheng Shishi Ai (生生世世愛; Love For Eternity) by Kary Ng
 Wangji Shijian (忘記時間; Forgetting Time) by Hu Ge
 Cisheng Buhuan (此生不換; Reluctant to Part) by Qingdao Feiyu
 Guanggun (光棍; Bachelor) performed by Hu Ge
 Daying Bu Aini (答應不愛你; Promise Not to Love You) by Ronald Cheng
 Pian'ai (偏愛; Insist on Loving You) by Chang Yun-jing
 Wozuo Wode Wang (我做我的王; Be My Own King) by Xiongdi Lian
 Nishiwo Yishou Changbuwan Dege (你是我一首唱不完的歌; You're my Everlasting Song) by Guo Hengqi
 Xiangmo Jian (降魔劍; Demon-subduing Sword)
 Xuejian - Xianfan Zhilü (雪見 — 仙凡之旅; Xuejian - Immortal's Journey)
 Gongban Chuang Tianya (共伴闖天涯; Travel the World Together)
 Jingtian - Hujia (景天 — 護甲; Jingtian - Armour)
 Changqing - Zhongsheng Pingdeng (長卿 — 眾生平等; Changqing - Equality of All Sentient Beings)
 Long Kui - Qiannian Dengdai (龍葵 — 千年等待; Long Kui - Waiting for a Thousand Years)

See also
 Xuan-Yuan Sword: Scar of Sky

References

External links
  Chinese Paladin on CTV
  Chinese Paladin on Sina
  Chinese Paladin 3 official site
  Chinese Paladin official page on Chinese Entertainment Shanghai's website

Xianxia television series
2009 Chinese television series debuts
Chinese Paladin (TV series)
Television series by Tangren Media
Interquel television series
Chinese television shows based on video games
Television shows about reincarnation
Demons in television
Ghosts in television
Television about magic
Television series set in the Tang dynasty
Live action television shows based on video games